The pharyngeal apparatus is an embryological structure.

It consists of:
 pharyngeal grooves (from ectoderm)
 pharyngeal arches (from mesoderm)
 pharyngeal pouches (from endoderm)
and related membranes.

References

Pharyngeal arches
Animal developmental biology